Marc Gilbert F Elliott (born 19 October 1979) is an English actor from Stratford-upon-Avon, England, who is known for his role as Syed Masood in the BBC television soap opera EastEnders.

Personal life
Elliott was born on 19 October 1979 to a Scottish father and an Anglo-Indian mother, and was educated at Warwick School, an independent boys' school. He has a twin sister called Sophie and an older sister called Melissa.

Career
Before his television and stage debuts, Elliott's career began in radio hosting on various BBC radio stations.

Elliott has appeared in a number of productions at Stratford-Upon-Avon's Royal Shakespeare Theatre while studying at Warwick School. In 2006, he joined the cast of the acclaimed Royal National Production and following tour of The History Boys. With a mainly theatrical background before joining EastEnders he has appeared in Holby City and The Bill.

In 2009, Elliott was cast as Syed Masood in the BBC soap opera, EastEnders and he won the 2010 British Soap Award for Best Newcomer for this role. Syed was a gay Muslim struggling with his sexuality, family expectations and religion: his defining storyline was his gay affair with Christian Clarke. In September 2012, he announced he was leaving the soap, and on 15 November 2012 he made his last appearance.

After leaving EastEnders, Elliott joined the cast of Tape in the West End. In November 2013, Elliott appeared with The History Boys at the National Theatre 50 Years on Stage production, broadcast live by BBC Worldwide. In 2014 he appeared in Midsomer Murders: Wild Harvest and in the UK premiere of Urinetown: The Musical at St. James Theatre, as Mr. McQueen. He reprised his role in Urinetown with the West End transfer of the musical to the Apollo Theatre. In June 2016, Elliott made his first appearance as doctor Isaac Mayfield in the BBC medical drama Holby City. Since leaving Holby City in 2017, Elliot has continued to appear in stage productions across the UK. In 2019, he reprised his role in Holby City for a short stint. 2022 appeared in the BBC’s Call The Midwife as Anglo Indian train driver Lionel Corbett in a train crash disaster.

Filmography

References

External links

 

British male actors of South Asian descent
Living people
1979 births
English people of Scottish descent
British people of Indian descent
British male stage actors
British male soap opera actors
British twins
People from Stratford-upon-Avon
People educated at Warwick School
Anglo-Scots
British male actors of Indian descent